Anders Sørensen (born 20 February 1962) is a Danish professional golfer.

Professional career 
Sørensen qualified for the European Tour before the 1988 season. In his first two seasons, he made the cut in slightly more than half the events and recorded two top-10s. In 1990, his third season, would be a marked improvement. He recorded the best result of his career at the first event of the year, the Atlantic Open held in Porto, Portugal. Sørensen entered the fourth round in second place. With the collapse of overnight leader Ronald Stelten, an American player, Sørensen took a two shot lead to the 71st hole. He would falter down the stretch, however, and wind up in a six-way playoff. On the first playoff hole, in gale-force winds, he and four other competitors would make bogey or worse; Stephen McAllister's par won the event. Despite the disappointing finish, he would go on to his best year. He would make the cut in 21 of 26 events including that year's Open Championship. He finished a career-best 40th on the Order of Merit.

The following three seasons saw Sørensen play steady but not improve on his 1990 performance. He finished between 74th and 84th on the Order of Merit every year. His highlight was a second-place finish at the 1993 Hohe Brucke Austrian Open. Again, this result was resolved in a playoff; he lost to Ronan Rafferty's par on the first hole.

His 1995 and 1996 seasons were his last on the European Tour. He missed the cut in the easy majority of events and did not finish in the top 125 of the Order of Merit either season. He would not play full-time on the European Tour after the 1996 season.

Professional wins (2)

Swedish Golf Tour wins (2)

Source:

Playoff record
European Tour playoff record (0–2)

Results in major championships 

CUT = missed the half-way cut
"T" indicates a tie for a place
Note: Sørensen only played in The Open Championship.
Sources:

Team appearances
Amateur
European Youths' Team Championship (representing Denmark): 1979, 1981
European Amateur Team Championship (representing Denmark): 1979, 1981, 1983, 1985
Eisenhower Trophy (representing Denmark): 1980, 1982
St Andrews Trophy (representing the Continent of Europe): 1982 (winners)

Professional
World Cup (representing Denmark): 1987, 1988, 1989, 1990, 1991, 1992, 1993 (withdrew), 1995
Dunhill Cup (representing Denmark): 1988

References

External links

Danish male golfers
European Tour golfers
1962 births
Living people